The 2014 CONCACAF Awards were the second year for CONCACAF's awards for the top region football players, coaches and referees of the year. The shortlists were published on 11 December 2014. The results were announced on 23 December 2014.

Award winners and shortlists

Player of the Year

Female Player of the Year

Goalkeeper of the Year

Coach of the Year

Referee of the Year

Goal of the Year

This award applies only to goals scored during CONCACAF official competitions.

References 

CONCACAF trophies and awards
Awards
CONCACAF